BVN is an architecture firm based in Australia, with studios in Sydney, Brisbane, Canberra, New York and London. The firm has won more Sir John Sulman Medals than any other Australian practice.

History 
The firm was founded in 1926 with the original partners being Arthur William Forster Bligh and Colin Jessup. Athol Bretnall and Ronald Voller joined the partnership after World War II, and the firm became known as Bligh, Jessup, Bretnall and Partners. Graham Bligh entered the partnership in 1965. 

Bligh Voller Nield was established during 1997 to 1999 with the merger of Bligh Voller Architects, Lawrence Nield and Partners Australia, Grose Bradley and Pels Innes Neilson and Kosloff. In 2009, Bligh Voller Nield became BVN Architecture. In 2013 BVN merged with Donovan Hill to form BVN Donovan Hill. In 2014 the practice became BVN.

BVN is a large architectural firm in Australia with studios in Brisbane, Sydney, London and New York City. BVN's portfolio includes airports, commercial, defence, education, health, science, hospitality, interiors, master-planning, public buildings, residential, retail, sport, transport, urban design and workplace projects.

The firm has designed many buildings in Australia, as well as sport facilities for the 2004 Athens Olympic Games, 2008 Beijing Olympic Games and 2012 London Olympic Games.

Notable projects

BVN has designed some of Australasia's landmark buildings including the following major architectural projects:

Data

See also
Architecture of Australia

References

External links
BVN Website

Architecture firms of Australia
Architecture firms based in Victoria (Australia)
1997 establishments in Australia
Design companies established in 1997